Dionysios Mantalos (born Neo Psychiko, Athens, 29 October 1952) is the current Metropolitan bishop of Corinth. Mantalos was ordained as bishop of Corinth in 2006. He is a graduate of the Theological School of Athens.

Mantalos was ordained deacon in 1974 and priest in 1979. He was a preacher (1977), commissioner (1978) and chancellor (1990) of the Holy Metropolis of Chalkis. He also served as deputy director of the Apostolic Diakonia (2002) and chancellor of the Holy Synod of the Orthodox Church of Greece (2006).

In Chalkis, Mantalos was responsible for the youth and the Sunday schools and he contributed to the creation of 25 cultural centers and camps in Ilia, Euboea. Besides that he was director of the boarding school of the Metropolis of Chalkis and also operated religious schools of training personnel. His fight against drugs was significant. He was chairman of the board of the ‘center of drug prevention’ of Euboea.

He was ordained bishop of Corinth on October 15, 2006. In Corinth he continued his work with special emphasis on the youth. He has published many books and given numerous lectures, speeches and media interviews.

References

External links
  Holy Metropolis of Corinth

1952 births
Living people
Clergy from Athens
Orthodox bishops of Corinth